Gowdegaz (l also known as Gowd-e Gaz, Gowd Gaz, and GowdeGez) is a village in Fatuyeh Rural District, in the Central District of Bastak County, Hormozgan Province, Iran. At the 2006 census, its population was 446, in 98 families.

References 

Populated places in Bastak County